Signs of Life is a 1968 feature film written, directed, and produced by Werner Herzog. It was his first feature film, and his first major commercial and critical success. The story is roughly based on the short story "Der Tolle Invalide auf dem Fort Ratonneau" by Achim von Arnim.

Plot
During World War II, three German soldiers are withdrawn from combat when one of them, Stroszek, is wounded. They are assigned to a small coastal community on the Greek island of Kos while Stroszek recuperates. The men become increasingly stir crazy in their uneventful new assignment. Stroszek eventually goes mad.

Cast
 Peter Brogle - Stroszek
 Wolfgang Reichmann - Meinhard
 Athina Zacharopoulou - Nora
 Wolfgang von Ungern-Sternberg - Becker
 Wolfgang Stumpf - Captain
 Henry van Lyck - Lieutenant
 Julio Pinheiro - Gypsy
 Florian Fricke - Pianist
 Heinz Usener - Doctor
 Achmed Hafiz - Greek resident

Production
The fortress which gives the film's main setting is a real 14th-century fortress built by the Knights Hospitaller. Herzog's grandfather, Rudolf Herzog, lived and worked for several years as an archaeologist at this site, and published translations of the ancient Greek engravings which appear in the film. The old Turkish man who appears in the film with a written translation was the last surviving worker from Rudolf Herzog's archaeological project.

During several shots, Peter Brogle could only be filmed from the waist up after he had been injured in a tight-rope accident and spent several months in a walking cast. The man who appears as a pianist in one scene is keyboardist Florian Fricke of Popol Vuh, who composed and performed the music for many of Herzog's later films.

Themes
Many of Herzog's later films reference elements of Signs of Life. Stroszek includes a scene with a hypnotized chicken, and the main character's name is reused in Herzog's film Stroszek. The Wild Blue Yonder contains a shot of a valley of windmills.

Critical responses
The film was entered into the 18th Berlin International Film Festival, where it won the Silver Bear Extraordinary Prize of the Jury. The film won a German Film Award.

Signs of Life has a 91% approval rating on Rotten Tomatoes.

References

External links

1968 films
1968 drama films
German drama films
West German films
1960s German-language films
German black-and-white films
Films directed by Werner Herzog
German World War II films
Films set in Greece
Films set on islands
Films set in the Mediterranean Sea
Films shot in Crete
Films about mental health
Films based on short fiction
Silver Bear Grand Jury Prize winners
1968 directorial debut films
1960s German films